Wakamisugi is a surname. Notable people with the surname include:

 Wakamisugi Akiteru (1937–1983), sumo wrestler later known as Daigō Hisateru
 Wakanohana Kanji II (1953–2022), sumo wrestler, previously known as Wakamisugi Kanji

Japanese-language surnames